Wendy Xiomara Gómez Romero (born 31 May 1993) is a Salvadoran footballer who plays as a goalkeeper. She has been a member of the El Salvador women's national team.

International career
Gómez capped for El Salvador at senior level during the 2013 Central American Games and the 2014 CONCACAF Women's Championship qualification.

See also
List of El Salvador women's international footballers

References

1993 births
Living people
Salvadoran women's footballers
Women's association football goalkeepers
El Salvador women's international footballers
Central American Games competitors